This is a list of Sindhi language poets.

A 
Adal Soomro
 Ahmad Khan Madhosh
 Ali Gul Sangi
Allah Baksh Sarshar Uqaili
Anwar Peerzada

B 
Bedil
Parwano Bhatti
 Bherumal Meharchand Advani

I 
Imdad Hussaini

K 
 Khialdas Fani
Kamal Jamro

M 
 Mir Abdul Rasool Mir
 Mirza Qaleech Baig
 Moti Prakash
Muhammad Mohsin Bekas
 Muhammad Siddique Musafir
 Makhdoom Ameen Faheem
 Makhdoom Muhammad Zaman Talibul Moula

N 
 Narayan Shyam

S 
Sachal Sarmast
 Sarkash Sindhi
Sawan Fakir
Shah Abdul Latif Bhittai
Shah Inayat Rizvi
Shah Inayat Shaheed
Shaikh Ayaz
Sikandar Khan Khoso
Sobhraj Nirmaldas Fani

T 
Tajal Bewas

See also 
 Sindhi poetry
 List of Sindhi poets from India
 Sindhi literature

Lists of poets by language
Poets
Poets
Sindhi people
Poets